In the United States, the diploma privilege is a method for lawyers to be admitted to the bar (i.e. authorized to practice law) without taking a bar examination. Wisconsin is the only jurisdiction that currently allows diploma privilege as an alternative to the bar examination.

In 25 states, attorneys who were initially admitted to practice by another state's diploma privilege are eligible for admission to the state bar on motion of the admission committee.

History
Diploma privilege arose as a method for admission to the bar along with the rise of law schools in the United States. Prior to the 1870s, most aspiring lawyers trained through apprenticeships under a lawyer or a judge, a practice called "reading law". In the 1870s, law schools began to emerge across the country as an alternative form of legal education. To incentivize aspiring lawyers to attend law schools, many states offered "diploma privilege" to graduates of law schools, wherein they would receive automatic admission to the bar. This practice reached its peak between 1879 and 1917.

The practice of diploma privilege declined in favor of formal, written bar examinations from the late 1910s onward. The privilege was abolished in California in 1917. In 1921, the American Bar Association formally expressed opposition to diploma privilege. By 1948, only 9 states maintained diploma privilege. The most recent states to abolish diploma privilege and require law school graduates to sit for a bar examination were Mississippi in 1981, Montana and South Dakota in 1983, and West Virginia in 1988.

As of 2020, Wisconsin is the only state that allows graduates of in-state law schools to gain admission to the bar through diploma privilege rather than a bar examination. New Hampshire does not have diploma privilege, but its only law school has an alternative licensing program called the Daniel Webster Honors Program that allows a limited number of students who have completed certain curricula and a separate exam to bypass the regular bar exam. Iowa considered reinstating diploma privilege in 2014.

Diploma privilege in Wisconsin
In Wisconsin, J.D. graduates of the two American Bar Association-accredited law schools in the state, Marquette University Law School and the University of Wisconsin Law School, may seek admission to the State Bar of Wisconsin without having to sit for a bar examination. LLM and SJD graduates of these law schools are not eligible for diploma privilege.

The diploma privilege in Wisconsin dates to 1870, when it was passed by the Wisconsin State Legislature in the same legislation that established the University of Wisconsin Law School. At that time a law department was established in the State University and a course of study under able instructors was prescribed for students in the law department. The 1870 law provided that graduates of this department should be entitled to admission to the bar upon their certificate of graduation—that is, their law degree. It was offered to encourage future lawyers to get a formal legal education instead of simply "reading law," which was the typical legal training of the time. 

Graduates of out-of-state law schools, even if they are Wisconsin residents, must still take the Wisconsin bar exam to be admitted in Wisconsin. Likewise, graduates of Wisconsin law schools must take the bar exam in many other states in which they are going to practice. A number of U.S. states do not grant reciprocal admission for attorneys who obtained their bar admission through the diploma privilege, requiring those attorneys to take that state's bar exam, regardless of the length of that attorney's practice. The policy reasoning behind diploma privilege is to incentivize Wisconsin residents to attend in-state law schools and to keep Wisconsin residents working in-state. Another policy consideration is preventing "brain drain" in Wisconsin. This theory holds that without the diploma privilege, the smartest from the state will leave Wisconsin for their education or for their career, specifically to nearby Chicago (the Iowa Bar Association cited similar territorial concerns). Another advantage is that state of Wisconsin subsidizes in-state resident tuition for law students, and therefore incentivizes them to stay to retain the state's educational investment. It is also claimed that the diploma privilege helps keep youth in Wisconsin. 

In Wiesmueller v. Kosobucki, a class action lawsuit certified in the United States District Court for the Western District of Wisconsin in June 2008, the petitioners asserted that the state's policy discriminates against interstate commerce in violation of the Commerce Clause because it affords a diploma privilege in lieu of a bar examination only to lawyers graduating from Wisconsin's law schools. The suit sought injunctive relief to expand the privilege to all applicants to the Wisconsin Bar who obtain a J.D. from any law school accredited by the American Bar Association. The district court subsequently dismissed the case for failure to state a cause of action. On July 9, 2009, the Seventh Circuit reversed the district court's dismissal of the case, saying "we find ourselves in an evidentiary vacuum created by the early termination of the case," and remanded the case to the district court.

Diploma privilege during the COVID-19 pandemic
There has been a renewed interest in diploma privilege as an alternative to the bar examination, which is generally administered in large conference rooms and auditoriums every July and February, in light of the COVID-19 pandemic. On March 22, 2020, several legal scholars who study licensure identified "emergency diploma privilege" as an alternative that showed "considerable promise" in a working paper discussing how states may continue to license new lawyers during the COVID-19 pandemic. The National Conference of Bar Examiners (NCBE), which writes the Uniform Bar Exam (UBE), came out in opposition of diploma privilege in a white paper in which it argued that bar exams ensure lawyer competency. Several legal news outlets criticized the NCBE's position, noting that the NCBE has a conflict of interest as the developer of the UBE and that the NCBE's President and CEO, Judith Gundersen, is a recipient of diploma privilege herself. A number of petitions for emergency diploma privilege by law school deans, professors, and recent graduates in other states have grown. Organizations like United for Diploma Privilege have hosted webinars and organized recent graduates to circulate similar petitions in over 30 states.

On March 27, New York became the first state to announce the postponement of its July 2020 bar examination as a result of the COVID-19 pandemic. Several states and territories followed suit by postponing their exams to August, September, or October, while others have looked for alternative options to an in-person examination, including remote examinations or offering diploma privilege to qualified individuals. 39 jurisdictions postponed or canceled their July bar examinations, with postponed exams taking place in September, October, or other dates. 25 jurisdictions are offered remotely-administered examinations.

On April 21, Utah became the first state to grant temporary, emergency diploma privilege during the COVID-19 pandemic. Since then, Washington, Oregon, Louisiana, and the District of Columbia have all instituted temporary diploma privilege policies, as detailed in the table below. However, some Washington legal employers have told recent graduates that they will not recognize diploma privilege and want them to sit for the test regardless. In the District of Columbia, candidates who choose the diploma privilege option rather than taking the bar examination must be supervised for three years by a qualified attorney admitted to the D.C. bar. On July 6, New York State Senator Brad Hoylman introduced legislation to provide 2020 graduates with diploma privilege.

Notes

References

External links
Moran, Beverly. The Wisconsin Diploma Privilege: Try It, You'll Like It, 2000 Wis. L. Rev. 645 (2000).
Wisconsin Supreme Court Rules, Chapter 40, relating to bar admission
Reed, Alfred Zantzinger. Training for the Public Profession of the Law (Foundation 1921) pp. 266 (noting the abolition of the diploma privilege in California).
In re Yanni, 2005 SD 59, ¶ 13, 697 N.W.2d 394, 399 (describing the privilege's abolition in S.D.)

Legal education in the United States
Professional certification in law